Frank Edward Raab Jr. (August 4, 1921 – September 19, 2016) was an American Naval officer and insurance executive.

Raab was born in 1921 in Riverside, California. During World War II, he served with  the Seabees in the Pacific Theatre. After the war, he attended the University of California and received a bachelor's of science degree in business administration in 1946. He returned to active duty during the Korean War. He worked for 30 years for the Insurance Company of North America (INA) and eventually became the company's president and CEO. In 1976, he was hired by Allianz AG to establish the Allianz Insurance Company of North America (Allianz North America). He served as president and chairman of Allianz North America from 1976 to 1983.  Raab also continued to serve in the Naval Reserve, reaching the rank of rear admiral. He died in 2016 at Cedars Sinai Hospital in Los Angeles.

References

1921 births
2016 deaths
United States Navy personnel of World War II